Ivanovskoye is a rural locality (a village) in Nikiforovskoye Rural Settlement, Ustyuzhensky District, Vologda Oblast, Russia. The population was 39 as of 2002.

Geography 
Konyukhovo is the nearest rural locality.

References 

Rural localities in Ustyuzhensky District